Drvenik Veli is an island in Croatian part of Adriatic Sea. It is situated in the middle of the Dalmatian archipelago, northwest of Šolta,  from the mainland. The highest peak is 178 metres high. The only settlement on the island is the near-eponymous village of Drvenik Veliki with a population of 150 (2011 census).

The island was first inhabited in the 15th or 16th century. In Croatian documents from the 13th century, the island is mentioned as "Gerona" or "Giruna". Main industries are agriculture, fishing and tourism. The coast of the island consists of many sand and pebble beaches.

References

Sources

External links

 Web site dedicated to Drvenik veliki

Islands of Croatia
Islands of the Adriatic Sea
Populated places in Split-Dalmatia County
Landforms of Split-Dalmatia County